Gordon Fearnley (25 January 1950 – 25 June 2015) was an English footballer who spent time in the Football League, North American Soccer League and Major Indoor Soccer League.

In 1968, Fearnley signed with Sheffield Wednesday. In 1970, he moved to the Bristol Rovers. In 1976, the Rovers sent him on loan to the Toronto Metros-Croatia of the North American Soccer League. After just one game, he was sent south to the Miami Toros. In 1977, Bristol sold his contract to the Fort Lauderdale Strikers. In 1978, he left the NASL to play for the Cleveland Force in Major Indoor Soccer League. After one season, he played for the Chicago Horizon.

In May 1978, Fearnley was hired as the head coach of the Birmingham Bandits, a team in the newly created Super Soccer League. However, financial irregularities prevented the league from ever beginning operations and Fearnley was released. During the few months he worked with the Bandits, he met Alaina Jones, the team's director of public relations. The two eventually married. In the fall of 1978, he was hired as the head coach of the Cleveland Force of the newly established Major Indoor Soccer League. He took the team to a 2–4 record and resigned. After retirement he studied Physiotherapy & Law, and later worked as an attorney in Florida.

References

External links
Bristol Rovers transfers
NASL stats
Cleveland Force history
Caught in time: Bristol Rovers win the Watney Cup, 1972

1950 births
2015 deaths
Footballers from Bradford
English footballers
Sheffield Wednesday F.C. players
Bristol Rovers F.C. players
Toronto Blizzard (1971–1984) players
Miami Toros players
Fort Lauderdale Strikers (1977–1983) players
Cleveland Force (original MISL) players
Chicago Horizons players
English Football League players
North American Soccer League (1968–1984) players
Major Indoor Soccer League (1978–1992) players
Major Indoor Soccer League (1978–1992) coaches
English expatriate footballers
Association football forwards
English expatriate sportspeople in the United States
Expatriate soccer players in the United States
English expatriate sportspeople in Canada
Expatriate soccer players in Canada
English football managers